Harold W. Blot (born October 10, 1938) is a retired United States Marine Corps lieutenant general who served as the Deputy Chief of Staff for Aviation. He previously served as Assistant Deputy Chief of Staff for Aviation, and Commander, 3rd Marine Aircraft Wing as a major general.

References

1938 births
Living people
United States Marine Corps generals
People from Manhattan